Wojciech Szkudlarczyk (born 8 January 1986 in Poznań) is a Polish badminton player.

Career 
Wojciech Szklarczyk won in 2004 and 2005, three junior titles in Poland. Even as a junior he won also first medals in the adult. By 2011, he was second twice and third six times at the national championships. 2012, 2013 and 2014 he won the national championships. International he won in Wales and Hungary and participated in the badminton world championships in 2006, 2010, 2011, 2012, 2013 and 2014 as well as in the 2010 European Badminton Championships, where he reached rank 5 in the mixed doubles.

Achievements

BWF International Challenge/Series 
Men's doubles

Mixed doubles

  BWF International Challenge tournament
  BWF International Series tournament
  BWF Future Series tournament

References

External links 

 
 50. Indywidualne Mistrzostwa Polski

1986 births
Living people
Sportspeople from Poznań
Polish male badminton players